The National Olympic Committee of Iraq (NOCI) is the National Olympic Committee (NOC) for Iraq.  It was established in 1948 and recognized by the International Olympic Committee that same year. It was officially dissolved in May 2003 by L. Paul Bremer under Coalition Provisional Authority Order Number 2. but was reestablished in February 2004 with the assistance of the International Olympic Committee.

Its current Director General is Tiras Odisho an ethnic Assyrian Christian, a Karate expert and coach, based in Sweden.

The committee organizes the Iraqi participation in the Olympic Games, choose the participants and run the training program. It has 16 Olympic national federations members and 7 by the IOC national federations members.

See also
Iraq at the Olympics

References

External links
Official website

Iraq
Iraq at the Olympics
Oly
1948 establishments in Iraq

Sports organizations established in 1948